60 Seconds! is a  action-adventure video game developed and published by Polish studio Robot Gentleman. It was released for Windows on May 25, 2015, on December 18, 2017, for the Nintendo Switch, on March 6, 2020, for the PlayStation 4 and Xbox One, on December 28, 2017, for Android, and on September 22, 2016, for iOS. The game takes place in a suburban town as a nuclear bomb is set to detonate in 60 seconds, forcing a family of four to gather as many supplies as possible within the timeframe and then survive and eventually escape to a safer place with what supplies could be gathered.

The game was originally supposed to be a test to see if Unity was the right game engine to use. It ended up being released to the world because of how well the test went.

A revamped version of 60 Seconds! titled 60 Seconds! Reatomized was released on July 25, 2019.

Plot
60 Seconds! takes place in the United States during the 1950s. The game follows the McDoodle family (Ted, Dolores, Mary Jane, and Timmy) as they try to survive the effects of a nuclear apocalypse for as long as possible.

First, the player has the titular 60 seconds to acquire whatever supplies, family members, and diversional items (e.g. a checkers set), and bring them to an underground shelter beneath their house, including the family member they initially control, before a nuclear bomb is dropped on the neighborhood and detonates. Failure to do so affects the flow of the gameplay.

Each day, the player must make decisions for the family based on supplies available, limited information, or ability of family members. Some of these entail risks, and may result in poor health or even death of one or all of the family members.

For consumable supplies, the player must ration their usage, such as food and water among the family members, based on how much they initially acquired, their overall health, and their need for it. The player must also be cautious about the mental state of the family members, as the isolation of the shelter affects the gameplay as well. (e.g. Ted will turn one of his socks into a puppet and begin talking to it as if it was a person.)

At times, a character may be required to leave the shelter to scavenge for supplies and food. Again, this entails risk, as a family member may fall ill from the radiation outside, or may not come back because of an event resulting in the character's death.

Other times, a knock may be heard at the hatch of the underground shelter, and the player must make a decision on whether to ignore it, or open the hatch to allow whoever or whatever is there to interact with the characters. Depending on the event, this may result in a possible trade between the McDoodles and other affected families, or a shelter raid where supplies are stolen, or a mutant entering the shelter and mutating the family, ending the game.

If the player makes a decision at the right time, then there is the possibility of the U.S. Army coming to rescue the family, successfully ending the game.

Reception
60 Seconds! was reviewed on Steam as "very positive" (9,635 votes). The game also received on Metacritic a 75/100 and 80/100 for the PC version from critic reviews, and 6.3 mixed or average reviews from the users. Metacritic also gave the Xbox One version a 63/100 from critic reviews, while the Nintendo Switch version received 6.3 mixed or average reviews from the users. NintendoLife gave the game a 4/10 with the user ranking 10/10. PocketGamer listed 60 Seconds! as one of the top 15 best survival games for iPhone and iPad. Gamesnort gave the 60 Seconds! a 3.9 mark, while awarding it with badges: the Best Game of 2017, the Best in Adventure, the Best on Windows PS, the Best on Nintendo Switch and Mac.

The game was also widely played by streamers: PewDiePie, Markiplier, SSundee, Gloom, and more.

References

2015 video games
Action-adventure games
Windows games
MacOS games
Nintendo Switch games
PlayStation 4 games
Post-apocalyptic video games
Xbox One games
Single-player video games
Survival video games
Video games about insects
Video games about nuclear war and weapons
Video games set in the United States
Video games developed in Poland
Indie video games